Shyam Rajak is an Indian Leader from Rashtriya Janata Dal (RJD), previously serving as the Minister for Industries in the Government of Bihar under Nitish Kumar. He has previously served as Minister for Food and Consumer Protection from 2010-2015 in the JD(U) Government. He has also served as Minister of State for Energy, Public Relations Department and Law in Bihar government in the RJD rule under Rabri Devi. He is whip for main opposition party in Bihar legislative Assembly .

Political career 
In June 2009, Rajak quit his post as national general secretary of Rashtriya Janata Dal (RJD). He joined the Janata Dal (United) party and served as National President of Akhil Bharatiya Dhobi Mahasangh. Rajak has represented Phulwari seat more than once. He was one of the key leaders of the previous RJD party led by Lalu Prasad Yadav. Rajak was a former minister in Nitish Kumar's government. In August 2020, Rajak joined Rashtriya Janata Dal (RJD) again.

References

Year of birth missing (living people)
Living people
State cabinet ministers of Bihar
Bihar MLAs 2010–2015
Janata Dal (United) politicians
Rashtriya Janata Dal politicians